The Rosolino Pilo class was a class of eight destroyers of the Italian Regia Marina (Royal Navy) constructed before and during the First World War. Like other obsolete Italian destroyers, they were reclassified as torpedo boats in 1929, and seven ships served throughout the Second World War. Two ships were sunk by mines while under Italian service during the Second World War, with two more being seized by Nazi Germany following the Italian Armistice in 1943. The remaining three ships survived the war and continued in use with the post-war Italian Navy, with the last two of the class being decommissioned in 1958.

German capture 
Following Italy's surrender on 8 September 1943, Germany captured two of the Pilo-class vessels. Giuseppe Missori was renamed TA22, and Giuseppe Dezza was renamed TA35. These vessels were re-designated as torpedo boats and put into service with the Kriegsmarine. TA22 was attacked by the all-African American fighter group, the Tuskegee Airmen, who put her out of action. TA35 was sunk on 17 August 1944.

Operators

Ships

Notes

References

External links 
 Rosolino Pilo (1915) Marina Militare website

 

Destroyers of the Regia Marina
World War I naval ships of Italy
World War II destroyers of Italy
 
Destroyer classes
Torpedo boat classes